The 1979 Tournament Players Championship was a golf tournament in Florida on the PGA Tour, held March 22–25 at Sawgrass Country Club in Ponte Vedra Beach, southeast of Jacksonville. The sixth Tournament Players Championship, it was the third at Sawgrass and Lanny Wadkins won in the wind at 283 (−5), five strokes ahead of runner-up Tom Watson.

The first two years at Sawgrass had resulted with both winners at 289 (+1), but Wadkins jumped out to a 36-hole score of  Gusty winds and dry greens on the weekend caused high scores, but he held on with an even-par 72 in the final round for a comfortable win.

Defending champion Jack Nicklaus finished seventeen strokes back, in a tie for 33rd place.

Venue

This was the third of five Tournament Players Championships held at Sawgrass Country Club; it moved to the nearby TPC at Sawgrass Stadium Course in 1982.

Eligibility requirements 
1. All designated players

Miller Barber, Andy Bean (2), Ben Crenshaw (2), Lee Elder (2), Raymond Floyd, Rod Funseth (2), Al Geiberger, Lou Graham, Hubert Green (2), Mark Hayes, Jerry Heard (2), Dave Hill, Lon Hinkle (2), Hale Irwin, Don January, Tom Kite (2), Billy Kratzert, Bruce Lietzke, John Mahaffey (2), Jerry McGee, Mac McLendon (2), Johnny Miller, Gil Morgan (2), Jack Nicklaus (3), Andy North (2), Jerry Pate (2), Gary Player (2), Bill Rogers, Jim Simons (2), Ed Sneed, Dave Stockton, Lee Trevino (2), Lanny Wadkins, Tom Watson (2), Tom Weiskopf, Fuzzy Zoeller (2)

2. Winners of major PGA Tour co-sponsored or approved events beginning with the 1978 Tournament Players Championship and concluding with the tournament immediately preceding the 1979 TPC

Seve Ballesteros, Craig Stadler, Barry Jaeckel, Jeff Hewes, Jack Newton, Victor Regalado, Ron Streck

3. The current British Open champion

4. Leaders In PGA Tour Official Standings as necessary to complete the field, beginning with the 1978 Tournament Players Championship and concluding with the tournament scheduled to end on the Sunday immediately preceding the 1979 TPC, the Doral-Eastern Open

Source:

Field
Tommy Aaron, Wally Armstrong, Seve Ballesteros, Miller Barber, Dave Barr, Andy Bean, Frank Beard, Don Bies, Homero Blancas, Brad Bryant, George Burns, Bob Byman, George Cadle, Rex Caldwell, Bill Calfee, Billy Casper, Jim Colbert, Bobby Cole, Frank Conner, Charles Coody, Ben Crenshaw, Rod Curl, Jim Dent, Terry Diehl, Dale Douglass, Bob Eastwood, Danny Edwards, David Edwards, Dave Eichelberger, Lee Elder, Randy Erskine, Keith Fergus, Ed Fiori, Marty Fleckman, Bruce Fleisher, Raymond Floyd, Rod Funseth, Buddy Gardner, Al Geiberger, Gibby Gilbert, Bob Gilder, David Graham, Lou Graham, Hubert Green, Jay Haas, Joe Hager, Dan Halldorson, Phil Hancock, Morris Hatalsky, Mark Hayes, Jerry Heard, Jeff Hewes, Dave Hill, Mike Hill, Lon Hinkle, Joe Inman, Hale Irwin, Don Iverson, Peter Jacobsen, Barry Jaeckel, Don January, Tom Kite, Gary Koch, Billy Kratzert, Wayne Levi, Bruce Lietzke, John Lister, Bob Lunn, Mark Lye, Bob Mann, Graham Marsh, Fred Marti, Rik Massengale, Gary McCord, Mike McCullough, Mark McCumber, Pat McGowan, Mac McLendon, Artie McNickle, Steve Melnyk, Lee Mikles, Allen Miller, Johnny Miller, Lindy Miller, Jeff Mitchell, Florentino Molina, Orville Moody, Gil Morgan, Mike Morley, Bob Murphy, Jim Nelford, Larry Nelson, Jack Newton, Jack Nicklaus, Andy North, Peter Oosterhuis, Arnold Palmer, Alan Pate, Jerry Pate, Eddie Pearce, Calvin Peete, Mark Pfeil, Gary Player, Don Pooley, Greg Powers, Tom Purtzer, Victor Regalado, Mike Reid, Jack Renner, Chi Chi Rodriguez, Bill Rogers, Ed Sabo, Cesar Sanudo, John Schroeder, Bob Shearer, Jim Simons, Scott Simpson, Tim Simpson, J. C. Snead, Ed Sneed, Craig Stadler, Dave Stockton, Curtis Strange, Ron Streck, Mike Sullivan, Alan Tapie, Barney Thompson, Leonard Thompson, Jim Thorpe, Lee Trevino, Howard Twitty, Bobby Wadkins, Lanny Wadkins, Bobby Walzel, Tom Watson, D. A. Weibring, Tom Weiskopf, Carlton White, Bob Wynn, Kermit Zarley, Bob Zender, Larry Ziegler, Fuzzy Zoeller

Round summaries

First round
Thursday, March 22, 1979

Source:

Second round
Friday, March 23, 1979

Source:

Third round
Saturday, March 24, 1979

Source:

Final round
Sunday, March 25, 1979

References

External links
The Players Championship website

1979
1979 in golf
1979 in American sports
1979 in sports in Florida
March 1979 sports events in the United States